John Natale is an American soccer coach, and current head coach for the Hartford Hawks women's soccer team. Before becoming the head coach at Hartford, Natale was an assistant for the Boston Breakers, and an assistant at Hartford in 2000.

Coaching career
Natale served as an assistant at Hartford during the 2000 season, where the team posted a 17–4 record, losing to Harvard in the second round of the NCAA tournament. In his third season at Hartford, Natale led the team to a 10–9–2 record and a berth in the NCAA tournament. At Hartford he has won one conference tournament and five regular season championships. In 2015 Natale was inducted into the Connecticut Soccer coaches Hall of Fame.

Head coaching record

†NCAA canceled 2020 collegiate activities due to the COVID-19 virus.

References

External links
 Official biography, Hartford Hawks

Living people
American soccer coaches
American women's soccer coaches
People from Wethersfield, Connecticut
Soccer players from Connecticut
Hartford Hawks women's soccer coaches
Eastern Connecticut State University alumni
Year of birth missing (living people)
Western Mass Pioneers players
Association footballers not categorized by position
Association football players not categorized by nationality